The Russian Second League 1992 was the first edition of Russian Second Division. There were 6 zones with 115 teams in total.

Zone 1

{| class="wikitable"
! Pos
! Team
! 1991 league and position
! Head coach
|- 
| bgcolor="#ccffcc" | 1.
| FC Erzu Grozny
| First professional season
| Timur Kuriyev
|- 
| bgcolor="#ccffcc" | 2.
| FC Kolos Krasnodar
| First professional season 
| Vladimir Petrov (until August)Oleg Ivanov (from August)
|-
| 3.
| FC Khimik Belorechensk
| Soviet Second League B, Zone 4, 6th
| Khamza Bagapov
|-
| 4.
| FC Kavkazkabel Prokhladny
| Soviet Second League B, Zone 4, 18th(as FC Remontnik Prokhladny)
| Sergei Ponomaryov
|-
| 5.
| FC Anzhi Makhachkala
| First professional season
| Makhach Kerimov
|-
| 6.
| FC Kuban Barannikovskiy
| Soviet Second League B, Zone 5, 7th
| Nikolai Smirnov
|-
| 7.
| FC Kaspiy Kaspiysk
| Soviet Second League B, Zone 4, 21st
| Vyacheslav Lyogkiy
|-
| 8.
| FC Mashuk Pyatigorsk
| Soviet Second League B, Zone 4, 12th
| Valeri Zubakov (until July)Sergei Razaryonov (from August)
|-
| 9.
| FC Torpedo Armavir
| Soviet Second League B, Zone 4, 16th
| Viktor Tishchenko (until August)Viktor Anokhin (from August)
|-
| 10.
| FC Beshtau Lermontov
| First professional season
| Viktor Vashchenko
|- 
| 11.
| FC Dynamo Izobilny
| Soviet Second League B, Zone 4, 7th(as FC Signal Izobilny)
| Sergei Zimenkov / Igor Gileb
|-
| 12.
| FC Druzhba Budyonnovsk
| Soviet Second League B, Zone 4, 14th
| Sergei Tashuev
|-
| 13.
| FC Astrateks Astrakhan
| First professional season 
| Ivan Buzychkin
|-
| 14.
| FC Niva Slavyansk-na-Kubani
| Soviet Second League B, Zone 5, 22nd(as FC Golubaya Niva Slavyansk-na-Kubani)
| Vladimir Vengrinovich
|-
| 15.
| FC Venets Gulkevichi
| First professional season 
| Anatoli Lyz
|-
| 16.
| FC Urartu Grozny
| First professional season
| Ruslan Gargayev
|-
| 17.
| FC Torpedo Adler
| First professional season 
| Yuri Orduli (until August)Yuri Nesterenko (from August)
|- 
| style="background:#ffcccc;" | 18.
| FC Altair-Khelling Derbent
| Did not play professionally in 1991 
| Aga Rzayev
|- 
| style="background:#ffcccc;" | 19.
| FC Lokomotiv Mineralnye Vody
| Soviet Second League B, Zone 4, 15th
| Vladimir Nigmatullin
|- 
| style="background:#ffcccc;" | 20.
| FC Vaynakh Shali
| Soviet Second League B, Zone 4, 17th
| Sergei Gridnev
|-
|}

Standings 

Note: FC Dynamo Izobilny, FC Altair-Khelling Derbent, FC Lokomotiv Mineralnye Vody and FC Vaynakh Shali did not participate in any national-level competitions in 1993, including the Amateur Football League.

Top scorers 
35 goals
 Igor Kuzmenko (FC Kolos Krasnodar)

23 goals
 Igor Khmelevskiy (FC Kavkazkabel Prokhladny)
 Igor Nikitin (FC Kuban Barannikovskiy)

16 goals
 Oleg Kozemov (FC Mashuk Pyatigorsk)
 Gennadi Kulnev (FC Lokomotiv Mineralnye Vody)

14 goals
  Ibragim Gasanbekov (FC Anzhi Makhachkala)
  Ruslan İdiqov (FC Erzu Grozny)
 Vladimir Shashorin (FC Venets Gulkevichi)

13 goals
 Artur Agabekyan (FC Torpedo Armavir)
 Igor Pirogov (FC Mashuk Pyatigorsk)
 Arif Romanov (FC Beshtau Lermontov)
 Pavel Sergiyenko (FC Kavkazkabel Prokhladny)

Zone 2
{| class="wikitable"
! Pos
! Team
! 1991 league and position
! Head coach
|-
|  bgcolor="#ccffcc"|1.
| FC Avtodor-Olaf Vladikavkaz
| Soviet Second League B, Zone 4, 13th(as FC Avtodor Vladikavkaz)
| Givi Kerashvili
|- 
| bgcolor="#ccffcc"|2.
| FC Avangard Kamyshin
| Soviet Second League B, Zone 5, 17th
| Vladimir Borisov
|-
| 3.
| FC SKA Rostov-on-Don
| Soviet Second League B, Zone 4, 10th
| Aleksandr Tumasyan
|-
| 4.
| FC Shakhtyor Shakhty
| Soviet Second League B, Zone 5, 9th
| Yevgeni Grunin
|-
| 5.
| FC Etalon Baksan
| Soviet Second League B, Zone 4, 4th
| Viktor Batalin
|-
| 6.
| FC Zvezda-Rus Gorodishche
| Soviet Second League B, Zone 4, 9th(as FC Zvezda Gorodishche)
| Vladimir Osipov (until August)Radiy Rakhimov (from August)
|-
| 7.
| FC Arsenal Tula
| Soviet Second League B, Zone 5, 12th
| Vladimir Alyokhin
|- 
| style="background:#ffcccc;"|8.
| FC Ritm Belgorod
| Soviet Second League B, Zone 5, 6th
| Aleksandr Kryuchkov
|-
| 9.
| FC Volgar Astrakhan
| Soviet Second League B, Zone 4, 11th
| Vladimir Yulygin
|-
| 10.
| FC Avangard Kursk
| Soviet Second League B, Zone 5, 8th
| Aleksandr Galkin
|-
| 11.
| FC Irgiz Balakovo
| First professional season
| Vladimir Proskurin
|-
| 12.
| FC Sherstyanik Nevinnomyssk
| Soviet Second League B, Zone 4, 20th
| Leonid Shevchenko
|- 
| style="background:#ffcccc;"|13.
| FC Start Yeysk
| Soviet Second League B, Zone 5, 10th
| Viktor Tsybin
|-
| 14.
| FC Dynamo Bryansk
| Soviet Second League, Center, 11th
| Vyacheslav Perfilyev
|-
| 15.
| FC Turbostroitel Kaluga
| First professional season 
| Georgi Kolmogorov
|- 
| style="background:#ffcccc;"|16.
| FC Iskra Novoaleksandrovsk
| First professional season 
| Yuri Kotov
|-
| 17.
| FC Metallurg Krasny Sulin
| Soviet Second League B, Zone 5, 21st
| Gennadi Tevosov
|-
| 18.
| FC Rotor-d Volgograd
| First professional season 
| Pyotr Orlov
|-
| 19.
| FC Spartak Oryol
| Soviet Second League B, Zone 5, 18th
| Valentin Gayan
|-
| 20.
| FC Rostselmash-d Rostov-on-Don
| First professional season 
| Viktor Odintsov / Valentin Khakhonov
|-
| 21.
| FC Spartak Tambov
| Soviet Second League B, Zone 5, 13th
| Vladimir Kovylin
|- 
| style="background:#ffcccc;"|22.
| FC Tekstilshchik-d Kamyshin
| First professional season  
| Vladimir Parmuzin
|-
|}

Standings 

Note: FC Ritm Belgorod, FC Start Yeysk, FC Iskra Novoaleksandrovsk and FC Tekstilshchik-d Kamyshin did not participate in any national-level competitions in 1993, including the Amateur Football League.

Top scorers 
46 goals
 Yuri Vostrukhin (FC SKA Rostov-on-Don)

29 goals
 Timur Bogatyryov (FC Ritm Belgorod)

27 goals
 Sergei Mironichev (FC Avangard Kamyshin)

24 goals
 Mikhail Golikov (FC Volgar Astrakhan)

22 goals
 Gennadi Remezov (FC Irgiz Balakovo)

21 goals
 Yuri Tolmachyov (FC Avangard Kursk)

20 goals
 Aleksandr Semenyukov (FC Start Yeysk)
 Yuri Yakovlev (FC Sherstyanik Nevinnomyssk)

19 goals
 Arsen Sekrekov (FC Etalon Baksan)

18 goals
 Vladimir Kharin (FC Irgiz Balakovo)

Zone 3
{| class="wikitable"
! Pos
! Team
! 1991 league and position
! Head coach
|- 
| 1.
| FC Spartak-d Moscow
| First professional season
| Viktor Zernov
|- 
| bgcolor="#ccffcc"|2.
| FC Znamya Truda Orekhovo-Zuyevo
| Soviet Second League B, Zone 6, 11th
| Yevgeni Zhuchkov
|- 
| bgcolor="#ccffcc"|3.
| FC Interros Moskovsky
| First professional season
| Leonid Pribylovsky
|- 
| 4.
| FC Torpedo Mytishchi
| Soviet Second League B, Zone 5, 19th
| Vyacheslav Zhuravlyov
|- 
| style="background:#ffcccc;"|5.
| FC Pele Moscow
| First professional season 
| Aleksei Belenkov (until August)Andrei Batov (from August)
|- 
| 6.
| FC Titan Reutov
| First professional season 
| Valeri Vdovin
|- 
| 7.
| FC Dynamo-d Moscow
| First professional season  
| Adamas Golodets
|- 
| 8.
| FC Oka Kolomna
| Soviet Second League B, Zone 5, 11th
| Aleksandr Kuznetsov
|- 
| 9.
| FC Avangard Kolomna
| Did not play professionally in 1991
| Vyacheslav Sarychev
|- 
| 10.
| FC Torgmash Lyubertsy
| Soviet Second League B, Zone 5, 20th
| Anatoli Leshchenkov
|- 
| 11.
| PFC CSKA-d Moscow
| First professional season 
| Aleksandr Kolpovskiy
|- 
| 12.
| FC Torpedo-d Moscow
| First professional season  
| Sergei Petrenko
|- 
| 13.
| PFC CSKA-2 Moscow
| Soviet Second League B, Zone 6, 22nd
| Leonid Nazarenko
|- 
| 14.
| FC Saturn Ramenskoye
| Soviet Second League B, Zone 6, 13th
| Valeri Tyukulmin
|- 
| 15.
| FC TRASKO Moscow
| Soviet Second League B, Zone 6, 18th(as FC Zvezda Moscow)
| Viktor Razumovskiy
|- 
| 16.
| FC Presnya Moscow
| Soviet Second League B, Zone 6, 19th
| Gennadi Sakharov / Yuri Vanyushkin
|- 
| 17.
| FC Dynamo-2 Moscow
| Soviet Second League B, Zone 6, 20th
| Yevgeni Baikov
|- 
| 18.
| FC Mosenergo Moscow
| First professional season 
| Valentin Sysoyev
|- 
| 19.
| FC Lokomotiv-d Moscow
| First professional season 
| Vladimir Korotkov
|- 
| style="background:#ffcccc;"|20.
| FC Trestar Ostankino
| First professional season  
| Mikhail Glazunov
|- 
| style="background:#ffcccc;"|21.
| FC Kinotavr Podolsk
| First professional season
| Yuri Khromov / Andrei Romanov
|}

Standings 

Notes: 
 FC Spartak-d Moscow was the reserves squad for FC Spartak Moscow and could not advance to the Russian First League according to the rules of the competition.
 FC Pele Moscow, FC Trestar Ostankino and FC Kinotavr Podolsk did not participate in any national-level competitions in 1993, including the Amateur Football League.

Top scorers 
26 goals
 Mikhail Maryushkin (FC Pele Moscow)

19 goals
  Serhiy Perepadenko (FC Spartak-d Moscow)

17 goals
 Nikolai Kovardayev (FC Dynamo-d Moscow)
 Sergei Lavrentyev (FC Interros Moskovskiy)
 Igor Pimenov (FC Znamya Truda Orekhovo-Zuyevo)

16 goals
 Aleksei Bychkov (PFC CSKA-2 Moscow)
 Gennadi Filippov (FC Avangard Kolomna)
 Nikolai Popenko (FC Torpedo Mytishchi)
 Dmitri Prokopenko (FC TRASKO Moscow)

15 goals
 Andrei Gashkin (FC Znamya Truda Orekhovo-Zuyevo)
 Andrei Golubev (FC Pele Moscow)

Zone 4
{| class="wikitable"
! Pos
! Team
! 1991 league and position
! Head coach
|-
| bgcolor="#ccffcc"| 1.
| FC Baltika Kaliningrad
| Soviet Second League B, Zone 6, 5th
| Yuri Vasenin (until June)Kornei Shperling (from July)
|-
| bgcolor="#ccffcc"| 2.
| FC Smena-Saturn St. Petersburg
| First professional season
| Mark Rubin (until May)Viktor Vinogradov (from June)
|- 
| 3.
| FC Mashinostroitel Pskov
| Soviet Second League B, Zone 6, 9th
| Vladimir Kosogov
|- 
| 4.
| FC Khimik Dzerzhinsk
| Soviet Second League B, Zone 5, 14th
| Mikhail Senyurin
|- 
| 5.
| FC Torpedo Arzamas
| Soviet Second League B, Zone 7, 12th(as FC Znamya Arzamas)
| Vladimir Dergach
|- 
| 6.
| FC Lokomotiv St. Petersburg
| Did not play professionally in 1991 
| Mikhail Pavlov (until May)Sergei Vedeneyv (from June)
|- 
| 7.
| FC Aleks Gatchina
| First professional season 
| Nikolai Gosudarenkov
|- 
| 8.
| FC Vympel Rybinsk
| Did not play professionally in 1991
| Anatoli Kurbatov (until May)Yevgeni Bekenev (May–July)Vladimir Bubnov (from August)
|- 
| 9.
| FC Bulat Cherepovets
| Soviet Second League B, Zone 6, 8th(as FC Khimik Cherepovets)
| Vladislav Mikhailovskiy
|- 
| 10.
| FC Progress Chernyakhovsk
| Soviet Second League B, Zone 6, 14th
| Aleksandr Fyodorov
|- 
| 11.
| FC Torpedo Pavlovo
| Did not play professionally in 1991 
| Valeri Kalugin
|- 
| 12.
| FC Iskra Smolensk
| Soviet Second League B, Zone 6, 7th
| Anatoli Olkhovik
|- 
| 13.
| FC Zenit Penza
| Soviet Second League B, Zone 7, 17th(as FC Granit Penza)
| Aleksandr Komissarov
|- 
| 14.
| FC Kosmos-Kirovets St. Petersburg
| Soviet Second League B, Zone 6, 12th(as FC Kirovets St. Petersburg)
| Yuri Rudnev
|- 
| 15.
| FC Sputnik Kimry
| First professional season  
| None
|-
| style="background:#ffcccc;"| 16.
| FC Volzhanin Kineshma
| Soviet Second League B, Zone 6, 6th
| Vladimir Yermichev
|- 
| 17.
| FC Zvolma-Spartak Kostroma
| Soviet Second League B, Zone 6, 17th(as FC Spartak Kostroma)
| Vyacheslav Skoropekin
|- 
| 18.
| FC Karelia Petrozavodsk
| Soviet Second League B, Zone 6, 15th(as FC Spartak Petrozavodsk)
| Yevgeni Sokolov (until July)Gennadi Sarychev (from August)
|- 
| style="background:#ffcccc;"|19.
| FC Galaks St. Petersburg
| First professional season
| Vladimir Tsimerman
|- 
| 20.
| FC Volochanin Vyshny Volochyok
| Soviet Second League B, Zone 6, 21st
| Aleksandr Semyonov
|- 
|}

Standings 

Notes:

 FC Agtala Moscow was excluded from the league after playing 13 games (gaining 6 points in those). Agtala's results were discarded. They were coached by Igor Kiryakov and were playing their first professional season.
 FC Volzhanin Kineshma and FC Galaks St. Petersburg did not participate in any national-level competitions in 1993, including the Amateur Football League.

Top scorers 
25 goals
 Andrei Lapushkin (FC Smena-Saturn St. Petersburg)

18 goals
 Yuri Telyushov (FC Zenit Penza)

16 goals
 Aleksei Kostyunin (FC Torpedo Arzamas)

15 goals
 Yuri Kopylov (FC Baltika Kaliningrad)
 Dmitri Silin (FC Lokomotiv St. Petersburg)

14 goals
 Vladimir Rozhin (FC Bulat Cherepovets)

13 goals
 Sergei Antonov (FC Khimik Dzerzhinsk)
 Sergei Kornev (FC Torpedo Arzamas)
 Oleg Pritula (FC Baltika Kaliningrad)
 Oleg Sofonov (FC Torpedo Pavlovo)
 Igor Yershov (FC Khimik Dzerzhinsk)

Zone 5
{| class="wikitable"
! Pos
! Team
! 1991 league and position
! Head coach
|-
| bgcolor="#ccffcc"| 1.
| FC Neftekhimik Nizhnekamsk
| Soviet Second League B, Zone 7, 9th
| Vladimir Morozov (until July)Vladimir Mukhanov (from August)
|-
| bgcolor="#ccffcc"| 2.
| FC Gazovik Izhevsk
| Soviet Second League B, Zone 7, 10th
| Aleksandr Salnov
|-
| 3.
| FC Avtopribor Oktyabrsky
| Soviet Second League B, Zone 7, 15th
| Viktor Khaidarov
|-
| 4.
| FC Tekstilshchik Isheyevka
| Soviet Second League, Center, 19th(as FC Start Ulyanovsk)
| Aleksandr Korolyov
|-
| 5.
| FC Sibir Kurgan
| Soviet Second League B, Zone 7, 8th
| Viktor Prozorov
|-
| 6.
| FC Gornyak Kachkanar
| First professional season
| Viktor Shlyayev
|-
| 7.
| FC Metallurg Novotroitsk
| Soviet Second League B, Zone 7, 16th
| Ivan Kikhtenko (until July)Vyacheslav Ledovskikh (from July)
|-
| 8.
| FC Azamat Cheboksary
| Soviet Second League B, Zone 7, 11th(as FC Stal Cheboksary)
| Gerold Drandov
|-
| 9.
| FC Zarya Krotovka
| Soviet Second League B, Zone 7, 21st(as FC Zarya Podgorny)
| Aleksandr Druganin
|-
| 10.
| FC KATs-Skif Naberezhnye Chelny
| First professional season
| Nikolai Nabok
|-
| style="background:#ffcccc;"| 11.
| FC Skat-5s Yelabuga
| First professional season
| Viktor Fedulov (until July)Ivan Yevsin (from August)
|-
| 12.
| FC Elektron Vyatskiye Polyany
| Soviet Second League B, Zone 7, 14th
| Aleksandr Sokovnin
|-
| 13.
| FC Energiya Chaykovsky
| First professional season 
| Sergei Kleymyonov
|-
| 14.
| FC Sodovik Sterlitamak
| Soviet Second League B, Zone 7, 13th(as FC Kauchuk Sterlitamak)
| Viktor Sukhanov
|-
| 15.
| FC Torpedo-UdGu Izhevsk
| First professional season
| Nikolai Gorshkov
|-
| 16.
| FC MGU Saransk
| First professional season 
| Igor Shinkarenko
|-
| 17.
| FC Gazovik Orenburg
| Soviet Second League B, Zone 7, 18th
| Nikolai Yelanev
|- 
| style="background:#ffcccc;"|18.
| FC Idel Kazan
| First professional season 
| Aleksandr Klobukov
|-
|}

Standings 

Notes:

 FC Skat-5s Yelabuga and FC Idel Kazan did not participate in any national-level competitions in 1993, including the Amateur Football League.

Top scorers 
26 goals
 Eduard Rakhmangulov (FC Neftekhimik Nizhnekamsk)

18 goals
 Stanislav Fedotov (FC Tekstilshchik Isheyevka)

17 goals
 Viktor Tishkin (FC Azamat Cheboksary)

14 goals
 Aleksei Musikhin (FC Torpedo-UdGU Izhevsk / FC Gazovik Izhevsk)

13 goals
 Vyacheslav Suspitsin (FC Gazovik Orenburg)
 Oleg Vyatchanin (FC Torpedo-UdGU Izhevsk / FC Gazovik Izhevsk)

12 goals
 Oleg Kamyshev (FC Metallurg Novotroitsk)
 Igor Syrov (FC Avtopribor Oktyabrsky)
 Aleksandr Varnosov (FC Azamat Cheboksary)
 Dmitri Yemelyanov (FC Zarya Krotovka)

Zone 6
{| class="wikitable"
! Pos
! Team
! 1991 league and position
! Head coach
|- 
| bgcolor="#ccffcc"|1.
| FC Zarya Leninsk-Kuznetsky
| Soviet Second League B, Zone 10, 17th(as FC Shakhtyor Leninsk-Kuznetsky)
| Sergei Vasyutin
|- 
| bgcolor="#ccffcc"|2.
| FC Metallurg Aldan
| First professional season 
| Vladimir Nomirovskiy
|-
| 3.
| FC Aleks Angarsk
| Soviet Second League B, Zone 10, 14th(as FC Angara Angarsk)
| Boris Zhuravlyov (until June)Oleg Izmailov (from June)
|-
| 4.
| FC Torpedo Rubtsovsk
| Soviet Second League B, Zone 10, 15th
| Vladimir Vorgeyev
|-
| 5.
| FC Dynamo Kemerovo
| Soviet Second League B, Zone 10, 13th
| Boris Rusanov
|-
| 6.
| FC Agan Raduzhny
| First professional season 
| Aleksandr Shudrik
|-
| 7.
| FC Shakhtyor Artyom
| Soviet Second League B, Zone 10, 16th
| Aleksandr Kezin (until July)Boris Kolokolov (from August)
|-
| 8.
| FC Gornyak Gramoteino
| First professional season 
| Vyacheslav Poddubny
|- 
| style="background:#ffcccc;"|9.
| FC Neftyanik Uray
| First professional season 
| Leonid Shor
|-
| 10.
| FC Politekhnik-92 Barnaul
| First professional season 
| Valeri Afonin
|-
|  style="background:#ffcccc;"|11.
| FC Spartak Gorno-Altaysk
| First professional season 
| Aleksandr Pavlov
|- 
| style="background:#ffcccc;"|12.
| FC Angara Boguchany
| First professional season 
| Suleyman Demirdzhi
|- 
| style="background:#ffcccc;"|13.
| FC Progress Biysk
| Soviet Second League B, Zone 10, 18th
| Aleksandr Meyzer
|-
|}

Standings 

Notes:

 FC Neftyanik Uray, FC Spartak Gorno-Altaysk, FC Angara Boguchany and FC Progress Biysk did not participate in any national-level competitions in 1993, including the Amateur Football League.

Top scorers 
22 goals
 Sergei Toporov (FC Zarya Leninsk-Kuznetsky)

13 goals
 Yevgeni Burdinskiy (FC Zarya Leninsk-Kuznetsky)

11 goals
 Ruslan Yalovenko (FC Neftyanik Uray)

10 goals
 Yuri Kuznetsov (FC Aleks Angarsk)
 Yevgeni Savin (FC Politekhnik-92 Barnaul)

9 goals
 Yuri Miller (FC Spartak Gorno-Altaysk)
 Yuri Sergiyenko (FC Shakhtyor Artyom)

8 goals
 Sergey Ageyev (FC Politekhnik-92 Barnaul)
 Igor Kuzmin (FC Dynamo Kemerovo)
 Anatoli Panchenko (FC Torpedo Rubtsovsk)

See also
1992 Russian Top League
1992 Russian First League

References
 Russian Second League 1992 on KLISF

3
1992
Russia
Russia